The Leicestershire Rugby Union (LRU) is the governing body for the sport of rugby union in the counties of Leicestershire and Rutland in England. The union is the constituent body of the Rugby Football Union (RFU) for those counties. The LRU administers and organises rugby union clubs and competitions in those two counties and administers the Leicestershire county rugby representative teams.

History 
The Leicestershire Rugby Union was founded as the Leicestershire County Football Union in 1887 after a meeting of rugby clubs in Leicester and was affiliated to the RFU in 1890. The union was a sub-union of the Midland Counties Rugby Union until just after World War One when the Midland Counties union was dissolved, partly because players from Leicester had come to dominate the Midland Counties team. In 1920 the LRU became a full constituent member of the RFU and began competing in the County Championship. The union initially also administered rugby union in Nottinghamshire as well as Rutland and the first AGM of the new union took place in June 1920, when the name was changed to the Leicestershire Rugby Union. The union's control over Nottinghamshire ended when Notts, Lincs and Derbys Rugby Union was founded in 1925.

County team 
The Leicestershire senior men's county team currently competes in the Division 2 of the English County Championship. Leicestershire won the third tier competition, the County Championship Shield, with victory over Cumbria at Twickenham Stadium in June 2015, having previously finished as losing finalists four times. Following their Shield win, the county moved up to County Championship Plate level.  In 2017 they won the County Championship Plate for the first time.

County team honours 
Men's
County Championship winners: 1925
County Championship Division 2 winners (2): 2017, 2019
County Championship Division 3 winners: 2015

Women's
County Championship winners: 2022

Affiliated clubs
There are currently 34 clubs affiliated with the Leicestershire RU, most of which have teams at both senior and junior level.  The majority of teams are based in Leicestershire but there are also teams from Rutland and even Warwickshire.

Anstey
Ashby
Aylestone Athletic
Aylestone St James
Aylestonians
Belgrave
Birstall
Burbage
Coalville
Cosby
De Montfort University
Hinckley
Leicester Forest
Leicester Lions
Leicester Medics
Leicester Thursday
Light Blues
Loughborough
Loughborough Students
Lutterworth
Market Bosworth. 
Market Harborough
Melton Mowbray
Oadby Wyggestonian
Oakham
Old Newtonians
Quorn
Shepshed
Sileby Town
South Leicester
Stoneygate
Syston
University of Leicester
Vipers

County club competitions 

The Leicestershire RU currently runs the following competitions for club sides based in Leicestershire and Rutland:

Cups

Leicestershire County Cup  - founded in 1890 as the Leicestershire Senior Cup, open to clubs typically playing at tiers 5-7 of the English rugby union system
Leicestershire Bowl

Discontinued competitions
Leicestershire Junior Cup - founded in 1887 as the second most important cup in the county until it was discontinued in 1936
Rolleston Charity Cup - founded in 1897, changed to a sevens competition in 1927 until it was disbanded in 1979
Midlands 5 East (North) - tier 10 league that ran between 2006 and 2018
Midlands 5 East (South) - tier 10 league that ran between 2006 and 2010
East Midlands/Leicestershire 1 – tier 7-10 league for East Midlands and Leicestershire based clubs that ran between 1987 and 2000
East Midlands/Leicestershire 2 – tier 10-11 league for East Midlands and Leicestershire based clubs that ran intermittently between 1992 and 2000
East Midlands/Leicestershire 3 – tier 11-12 league for East Midlands and Leicestershire based clubs that ran intermittently between 1992 and 2000
East Midlands/Leicestershire 4 – tier 12-13 league for East Midlands and Leicestershire based clubs that ran between 1992 and 1996
Leicestershire 1 – tier 8-10 league that ran intermittently between 1992 and 1998
Leicestershire 2 – tier 9-11 league that ran intermittently between 1992 and 1998
Notts, Lincs & Derbyshire/Leicestershire 1 East – tier 9 league for Notts, Lincs and east Leicestershire clubs that ran between 2000 and 2004
Notts, Lincs & Derbyshire/Leicestershire 1 West – tier 9 league for Notts, Derbyshire and west Leicestershire clubs that ran between 2000 and 2004
Notts, Lincs & Derbyshire/Leicestershire 2 East – tier 10 league for Notts, Lincs and east Leicestershire clubs that ran between 2000 and 2004
Notts, Lincs & Derbyshire/Leicestershire 2 West – tier 10 league for Notts, Derbyshire and west Leicestershire clubs that ran between 2000 and 2004

See also
Midland Division
English rugby union system

References

External links 
Leicestershire Rugby Union website

Rugby union governing bodies in England
1887 establishments in England
Rugby union in Leicestershire
Sport in Rutland